The Delaware Valley Railway  was a short-line railroad in southeastern Pennsylvania and northern Delaware in the United States. The railroad was owned by RailAmerica. The Delaware Valley Railway operated two lines: one running from Elsmere, Delaware north to Modena, Pennsylvania and one running from Sylmar, Pennsylvania to Wawa, Pennsylvania. The railroad interchanged with CSX Transportation in Elsmere and the Brandywine Valley Railroad in Modena. The Delaware Valley Railway took over operations of these lines from the Octoraro Railroad on July 1, 1994. In 1999, the Delaware Valley Railway ceased operations, with the Brandywine Valley Railroad taking over operations of these lines. These lines are currently operated by the East Penn Railroad.

References

Defunct Delaware railroads
Defunct Pennsylvania railroads
Railway companies disestablished in 1999
Railway companies established in 1994
RailAmerica